Crataegus visenda is a species of hawthorn from the southeastern United States, in Alabama, Florida, and Georgia. It is a large shrub or small tree to 10 m tall.
It has been considered as a synonym of Crataegus flava Aiton (Ref. USDA Plants Profile)

References

External links
 
USDA Plants Profile for "Crataegus tristis Beadle"
USDA Plants Profile for Crataegus arrogans

visenda
Flora of North America